Live Air is a live album by the improvisational collective Air featuring Henry Threadgill, Steve McCall, and Fred Hopkins recorded at Studio Rivbea, in New York and the University of Michigan in Ann Arbor, first released by Black Saint Records in 1980.

Reception
The Penguin Guide to Jazz selected this album as part of its suggested Core Collection.

According to the Allmusic review by Brian Olewnick, "Live Air is a must for any fan of this wonderful trio".

Track listing
All compositions by Henry Threadgill
 "Eulogy for Charles Clarke" - 10:37
 "Portrait of Leo Smith" - 8:06
 "Keep Right on Playing Thru the Mirror over the Water" - 15:30
 "Be Ever Out" - 5:40 
Recorded at Studio Rivbea, New York on July 1, 1976 (tracks 1 & 2) and University of Michigan, Ann Arbor, Michigan on October 28, 1977 (tracks 3 & 4)

Personnel
Henry Threadgill - alto saxophone, flute, percussion
Fred Hopkins - bass
Steve McCall - drums, percussion

References

Air (free jazz trio) live albums
1977 live albums
Black Saint/Soul Note live albums